Cuenca is one of the five provinces of the autonomous community of Castilla-La Mancha. It is located in the eastern part of this autonomous community and covers 17,141 square km. It has a population of 203,841 inhabitants – the least populated of the five provinces. Its capital city is also called Cuenca.

Geography

The province is bordered by the provinces of Valencia (including its exclave Rincón de Ademuz), Albacete, Ciudad Real, Toledo, Madrid, Guadalajara, and Teruel. The northeastern side of the province is in the mountainous Sistema Ibérico area.

211,375 people (2007) live in the province. Its capital is Cuenca, where nearly a quarter of the population live, some 52,980 people. There are 238 municipalities in Cuenca.

Other populous towns and municipalities include Tarancón, San Clemente, Quintanar del Rey, Huete, Villanueva de la Jara, Motilla del Palancar, Mota del Cuervo, La Almarcha and Las Pedroñeras.

History
In 1851 Cuenca lost Requena-Utiel to the neighbouring Valencia Province, with which it was developing commercial ties. Nevertheless, Requena-Utiel remained Spanish-speaking (rather than Catalan), while the loss of its most dynamic region left the province of Cuenca relatively underdeveloped economically.

Population development
The historical population is given in the following chart:

Notes and references 

List of municipalities in Cuenca

 
C